Ben Grant is an Australian film producer. His films include Closed for Winter starring Natalie Imbruglia and Clubland (AKA Introducing the Dwights). He is Executive Producer of the musical film The Sapphires which is set for a late 2012 release and stars Jessica Mauboy and Deborah Mailman. He was nominated for the AACTA award for best telefeature in 2004, along with Kylie Du Fresne, and Rosemary Blight for Small Claims.

References

External links 
 

Living people
Australian film producers
Year of birth missing (living people)